Manej Sport Arena is an indoor arena in Chișinău, Moldova.

References

External links
 Manej Sport Arena on Wikimapia

Buildings and structures in Chișinău
Sport in Chișinău